Jeeser is a railway station in the village of Jeeser, Mecklenburg-Vorpommern, Germany. The station lies on the Angermünde-Stralsund railway and the train services are operated by Usedomer Bäderbahn.

Train services
The station is served by the following service:
Local services  (Rostock -) Stralsund - Greifswald - Züssow

References

External links
Deutsche Bahn website

Railway stations in Mecklenburg-Western Pomerania
Railway stations in Germany opened in 1880